{{Infobox military person
| name          = Gustav Schwarzenegger
| image         = Gustav Schwarzenegger.jpg
| birth_date    = 
| birth_place   = Austria-Hungary
| death_date    = 
| death_place   = Weiz, Steiermark, Austria
| placeofburial = Weiz Cemetery, Weiz, Steiermark, Austria
| allegiance    = 
| branch        =  Sturmabteilung
| serviceyears  = 1924–1945
| rank          =  
| unit          = 4th Panzer Army, 
| battles       = World War II
| awards        = Iron Cross 1st ClassWound Badge
| spouse        = 
| children      = 2, including Arnold Schwarzenegger
| laterwork     = Policeman
| module        = 
}}
Gustav Schwarzenegger (17August 190713December 1972) was an Austrian police chief, postal inspector, member of the Sturmabteilung (SA), and military police officer. He was the father of Arnold Schwarzenegger.

 Biography 
Gustav Schwarzenegger was born in Austria-Hungary, the son of Cecelia (née , 1878–1968) and Karl Schwarzenegger (1872–1927). His patrilineal grandfather, Wenzel Mach, was Czech and came from the village of Chocov near Mladá Vožice. Wenzel had a child out of wedlock with Kunigunde Schwarzenegger, and the child was originally named Carl Mach but later adopted his mother's surname, Schwarzenegger.

 Nazi Party and SA membership 
According to documents obtained in 2003 from the Austrian State Archives by the Los Angeles Times, Schwarzenegger voluntarily applied to join the Sturmabteilung (SA) on 1March 1924, fourteen years before the country was annexed. Austria became part of Nazi Germany after being annexed on 12March 1938. A separate record obtained by the Wiesenthal Center indicates he sought membership before the annexation, but was accepted only in January 1941.

The SA had 900,000 members in 1940, down from 4.2million in 1934. This six-year decline in SA membership was an extended result of the three-day-long purge known as the Night of the Long Knives, a political purge carried out by Adolf Hitler against the SA, seen at that time as too radical and too powerful by senior military and industrial leaders within the NSDAP.

 Military career 
Schwarzenegger had served in the Austrian Army from 1930 to 1937, achieving the rank of section commander, and in 1937, he became a police officer. He served in Poland, France, Belgium, Ukraine, Lithuania and Russia. His unit was  521 (mot.), part of Panzer Group 4.

Wounded in action in Leningrad, Russia, on 22 August 1942, Schwarzenegger was awarded the Iron Cross First and Second Classes for bravery, the Eastern Front Medal, and the Wound Badge; he also received significant medical attention for his injuries. Considered unfit for active duty, he returned to Graz, Austria, where he was assigned to work as a postal inspector.

A health registry document describes him as a "calm and reliable person, not particularly outstanding" and assesses his intellect as "average." Ursula Schwarz, a historian at Vienna's Documentation Centre of Austrian Resistance, has argued that Schwarzenegger's career was fairly typical for his generation, and that no evidence has emerged directly linking him with participation in war crimes or abuses against civilians. He resumed his police career in 1947.

Later life and death
They later had two sons,  and Arnold;  died on 20 May 1971 in a car accident while driving alone drunk on a mountain road.Total Recall, Arnold Schwarzenegger, Simon & Schuster, 2012, p. 134

Schwarzenegger died of a stroke on 13 December 1972, at the age of 65, in  Austria, where he had been transferred as a policeman. While visiting  Cemetery in August 1998, where her husband was buried, Aurelia Jadrny Schwarzenegger died of a heart attack at the age of 76; she is buried next to him. Their son, Arnold, stated in the film Pumping Iron'' that he did not attend his father's funeral, but later retracted this, explaining that it was a story he had appropriated from a boxer, to make it appear as though he could prevent his personal life from interfering with his athletic training.

News reports about Schwarzenegger's Nazi links first surfaced in 1990, at which time Arnold Schwarzenegger asked the Simon Wiesenthal Center, an organization he had long supported, to research his father's past. Media interest resurfaced when Arnold ran for Governor of California in the state's 2003 recall election.

In a 2021 video made in response to the United States Capitol attack, his son Arnold publicly recalled, for the first time, how Gustav was frequently drunk and abusive to his family when Arnold was young. He attributed this behavior to guilt and shame over what Gustav and other Nazis and collaborators had perpetrated or enabled during the war. His son brought up the war's impact on Gustav again in a 2022 video about the Russian invasion of Ukraine, in which he urged the Russian soldiers to not "be broken like (his) father" by continuing their invasion.

Notes

References

External links
 "Records: Arnold's father was member of Nazi storm troops", AP wire services via USA Today 24 August 2003

1907 births
1972 deaths
Schwarzenegger family
Austrian military personnel of World War II
Austrian Nazis
Austrian police officers
Austrian anti-communists
Austro-Hungarian people
Sturmabteilung personnel
German Army soldiers of World War II

sv:Arnold Schwarzenegger#Biografi